Cows and Beer is an EP by Die Kreuzen, released in 1982 through Version Sound.

Track listing

Personnel 
Die Kreuzen
Keith Brammer – bass guitar
Brian Egeness – guitar
Dan Kubinski – vocals
Erik Tunison – drums
Production and additional personnel
Richard Kohl – illustrations

References

External links 
 

1982 EPs
Die Kreuzen albums